Fort McMurray—Athabasca (formerly Athabasca) was a federal electoral district in Alberta, Canada, that was represented in the House of Commons of Canada from 1968 to 2015. It was a predominantly rural riding in northeastern Alberta, representing the Regional Municipality of Wood Buffalo, the Municipal District of Opportunity No. 17, the Municipal District of Lesser Slave River No. 124, Big Lakes County, Lac La Biche County, Athabasca County and the southeastern part of Northern Sunrise County.

Demographics
According to the Canada 2011 Census

Ethnic groups: 65.8% White, 22.1% Aboriginal, 3.8% South Asian, 2.5% Filipino, 1.9% Black, 1.2% Arab 
Languages: 80.7% English, 4.9% Cree, 3.1% French, 1.6% Tagalog 
Religions: 67.3% Christian (33.4% Catholic, 7.3% Anglican, 5.0% United Church, 3.8% Pentecostal, 1.5% Lutheran, 1.4% Baptist, 1.3% Christian Orthodox, 13.6% Other Christian), 3.4% Muslim, 1.5% Hindu, 26.2% No religion 
Median income (2010): $47,348

History
It was created as "Athabasca" riding in 1966 from Athabaska and Peace River ridings.

In 2004, it was renamed "Fort McMurray—Athabasca".

Following the Canadian federal electoral redistribution, 2012, this riding was abolished. 69% was redistributed into the new riding of Fort McMurray—Cold Lake, 19% to Peace River—Westlock (notably the towns of Slave Lake and High Prairie among others) and 11% to Lakeland.

Members of Parliament
This riding has elected the following Members of Parliament:

Election results

Fort McMurray—Athabasca, 2004–2015

Athabasca, 1968–2004

See also
 List of Canadian federal electoral districts
 Past Canadian electoral districts

References

Notes

External links
 
 
 Expenditures - 2008
 Expenditures - 2004
 Expenditures - 2000
 Expenditures - 1997
 Website of the Parliament of Canada
 Report on Federal Electoral Districts Redistribution

Former federal electoral districts of Alberta
Athabasca, Alberta
Fort McMurray